Puzeh Badi (also Romanized as Pūzeh Bādī; also known as Pūzeh Ābādī) is a village in Balyan Rural District, in the Central District of Kazerun County, Fars Province, Iran. At the 2006 census, its population was 344, in 76 families.

References 

Populated places in Kazerun County